The Bavarian Congregation is a congregation of the Benedictine Confederation consisting (with one exception) of monasteries in Bavaria, Germany.

It was founded on 26 August 1684 by Pope Innocent XI (1676-1689).

First Congregation

Until the secularisation of Bavaria in 1803 the following abbeys belonged to the congregation:
Andechs Abbey
Attel Abbey
Benediktbeuern Abbey
Ensdorf Abbey
Frauenzell Abbey
Mallersdorf Abbey
Michelfeld Abbey
Oberaltaich Abbey
Prüfening Abbey
St. Emmeram's Abbey
Reichenbach Abbey
Rott Abbey
Scheyern Abbey
Tegernsee Abbey
Thierhaupten Abbey
Weihenstephan Abbey
Weissenohe Abbey
Weltenburg Abbey
Wessobrunn Abbey

All these monasteries were dissolved in 1803, however, and the congregation lapsed at that point.

Second Congregation

The congregation was re-established by Pope Pius IX on 5 February 1858, comprising to begin with three monasteries re-founded by Ludwig I of Bavaria: Metten; St. Boniface's Abbey, Munich, with Andechs Priory; and Weltenburg.

 the members of the congregation, with the dates when they joined the congregation where known, were:
Andechs Priory, dependent on St. Boniface's Abbey, Munich (1858)
St. Stephen's Abbey, Augsburg
Braunau in Rohr Abbey (1984)
Ettal Abbey (1900), with a dependent student house in Munich
Metten Abbey (1858)
St. Boniface's Abbey, Munich (1858)
Niederaltaich Abbey (1918)
Ottobeuren Abbey (1893)
Plankstetten Abbey (1904)
Scheyern Abbey
Schäftlarn Abbey (1866)
Wechselburg Priory (in Saxony, a dependent house of Ettal) (1993)
Weltenburg Abbey (1858)

External links
 Bavarian Congregation webpage
 The Confederation of Benedictine Congregations 

1684 establishments in the Holy Roman Empire
17th-century establishments in Bavaria
Benedictine congregations
Religious organizations established in 1684
Catholic religious institutes established in the 17th century